Charles "Charlie" H. Pawsey (15 April 1923 – 7 January 2012) was an English professional rugby league footballer who played in the 1940s and 1950s. He played at representative level for Great Britain and England, and at club level for Langworthy ARLFC, Belle Vue Rangers, Leigh and Huddersfield, as a scrum cap wearing , i.e. number 11 or 12, during the era of contested scrums.

Background
Charlie Pawsey was born in Salford, Lancashire, England, he worked as a stevedore, and he died aged 88 in Salford, Greater Manchester, England.

Playing career

International honours
Charlie Pawsey won caps for England while at Leigh in 1951 against Wales, in 1952 against Other Nationalities (2 matches) and Wales, in 1953 against France (2 matches), Wales, and Other Nationalities, and won caps for Great Britain while at Leigh in 1952 against Australia (3 matches), and in 1954 against Australia (2 matches), and New Zealand (2 matches).

Charlie Pawsey also represented Great Britain while at Leigh between 1952 and 1956 against France (3 non-Test matches).

County Cup Final appearances
Charlie Pawsey played right-, i.e. number 12, in Leigh's 7-20 defeat by Wigan in the 1949 Lancashire County Cup Final during the 1949–50 season at Wilderspool Stadium, Warrington on Saturday 29 October 1949, and played left-, i.e. number 11, in the 6-14 defeat by Wigan in the 1951 Lancashire County Cup Final during the 1951–52 season at Station Road, Swinton on Saturday 27 October 1951.

Genealogical information
Charlie Pawsey's marriage to Ethel (née Swingler) was registered during fourth ¼ 1953 in Salford district. They had children; Julia A. Pawsey (birth registered during fourth ¼  in Manchester district), Charles S. Pawsey (birth registered during second ¼  in Salford district), and Matthew J. Pawsey (birth registered during third ¼  in Salford district).

References

External links
(archived by archive.is) U.K. League Hooker in Doubt
Charlie Pawsey : Obituary
Charlie Pawsey: Rugby league player of legendary hardness
Legendary GB hardguy Charlie Pawsey dies
Funeral details for Leigh legend Charlie Pawsey
Pawsey dies aged 88
Archie meets his hero
Rugby legend Charlie Pawsey dies
Game mourns the passing of former Great Britain international forward Charlie Pawsey
Leigh RL men's send-off for Charlie Pawsey
Former Great Britain international Charlie Pawsey dies aged 88
Charlie Pawsey, A Rugby League Hero and Hardman
Leigh and Great Britain rugby hard man Charlie Pawsey's funeral at Salford

1923 births
2012 deaths
Broughton Rangers players
England national rugby league team players
English rugby league players
Great Britain national rugby league team players
Huddersfield Giants players
Leigh Leopards captains
Leigh Leopards players
Rugby league players from Salford
Rugby league second-rows